Lecanodiaspis prosopidis is a species of scale insect of the family Lecanodiaspididae. The species was described by Maskell in 1895.

References

Insects described in 1895
Hemiptera of Australia
Lecanodiaspididae